The Tarnów train station bombing was a deadly bombing carried out by a German saboteur two days before the start of World War II in Europe. The attack took place in the city of Tarnów in Poland of the interwar period, ahead of the joint invasion of Poland by Nazi Germany and the Soviet Union. The time bomb planted by the secret agent exploded inside the station on the night of 28 August 1939, killing 20 people and wounding 35 others.

The population of Tarnów in 1939 was around 40,000. The busy train station of Tarnów Główny (Tarnów Central) was located on the railway line connecting two major agglomerations in southern Poland, Kraków to the west and Lwów to the east. Trains passed through Tarnów carrying thousands of travelers. The threat of imminent conflict with Germany added to the awaiting crowd many army reserve soldiers ordered to report to their units, as the international situation worsened day by day. The dense traffic was halted abruptly at 11:18 p.m., when a time bomb left by a German saboteur, Anton Guzy, exploded in the waiting hall. Twenty people at the station died instantly. It has been argued by commentators that the world war had just began.

Attack
The saboteur who planted the bomb – a man named Antoni (Anton) Guzy from Bielsko (german Bielitz) – was the son of a German mother and a Polish father. His father died during World War I, and in 1938 Guzy, a locksmith, became unemployed. In search of a job, he joined the Gewerkschaft Deutscher Arbeiter, a local organization which helped to organize employment in Germany.

It was probably through this agency that he was persuaded to carry out the attack. Guzy traveled to the Polish town Tarnów over the border from the german city of Gleiwitz with a man named Neumann. He left two suitcases packed with explosives in the luggage hall and went to a platform to wait for a night Luxtorpeda train from Krynica, via Tarnów, to Kraków, which, according to the schedule, would leave at 11:02 p.m. It is speculated that Guzy might not have known when the bomb would explode. He drank a beer at the station's restaurant, before taking a walk around the station. When the explosion took place, the saboteur, together with other passengers ran away in panic. Reportedly, his German masters might have planned for him to die in the attack.

The number of victims would have been much higher, had it not been for a stopping train from Kraków, which arrived eight minutes late. Also, a few minutes before the attack, a military transport with numerous soldiers had left the Tarnów station. Approximately one-third of the station building was destroyed. Rail workers and policemen spent hours searching for victims in the rubble.

It is impossible to reconstruct all the details of the attack. At 11:30 a.m. Guzy met a man from Skoczów named Neuman (given name unknown to him), who was a member of a German saboteur organization. Together, they went by rail to Kraków, leaving Bielsko-Biała station at 12:13 p.m. In Kraków they had coffee, and later took two heavy suitcases from a station's luggage office. According to Guzy's later statement, Neuman told him to leave both cases at the Tarnów station and return to Kraków, where he would be waiting.

After the explosion, Guzy was stopped by the railroad police, asked for his identity papers and released. Stopped again near the station, he was recognised as the man who had left the suitcases. During the interrogation he said that he felt sorry about what had happened, and that he had never received any money. Guzy's subsequent fate is uncertain. The German investigation conducted in 1941 concluded that he was shot in the first days of September 1939, before invading Germans reached the area.

See also 
Jabłonków Incident
Gleiwitz incident
Selbstschutz

Notes

External links
 http://www.gazetawyborcza.pl/1,75480,2887486.html  
 https://web.archive.org/web/20071225095343/http://www.tarnow.pl/historia/taka/1.php 
 http://www.diapozytyw.pl/pl/site/slady_i_judaica/tarnow 
 https://web.archive.org/web/20080217020218/http://www.go-tarnow.com/english/worth_seeing/tarnow-history.html 
 https://web.archive.org/web/20080225161215/http://www.bbc.co.uk/history/worldwars/wwtwo/countdown_390829_tue_04.shtml 
  Photos of the station after the attack, taken in the morning on Tuesday, August 29, 1939

Explosions in 1939
1939 murders in Poland
Attacks on railway stations in Europe
August 1939 events
Improvised explosive device bombings in Europe
Germany–Poland relations
Mass murder in 1939
Mass murder in Poland
Train station bombing
Terrorist incidents in Second Polish Republic
Terrorist incidents on railway systems in Europe
Terrorist incidents in the 1930s
Building bombings in Europe
State-sponsored terrorism